James Andrew MacGeorge (October 9, 1928 – January 16, 2021) was an American voice actor, puppeteer, stand-up comedian and writer. He is also credited Jim McGeorge and James MacGeorge.

Career

He is probably best known for his voice roles as Beany Boy, Crowy and Uncle Captain Horatio K. Huffenpuff in Beany and Cecil, Oliver Hardy on The Laurel and Hardy Cartoon Show, Crazy Claws in The Kwicky Koala Show, Bort in The Mighty Orbots, Wimper in Clue Club and as Dr. Wilmer Scarab in Bionic Six. He also voiced various characters in many other cartoon series and worked as a writer for Jay Ward Productions.

He appeared on camera in shows including Get Smart as Stan Laurel, Semi-Tough, Happy Days and the feature film Teenagers from Outer Space.

MacGeorge has reprised his role only as Uncle Captain Huffenpuff in The New Adventures of Beany and Cecil produced by DiC Entertainment and directed by John Kricfalusi, better known for his work on The Ren and Stimpy Show.

Filmography

Animated Roles
 1952 - Thunderbolt the Wondercolt - Various 
 1959 - Matty's Funday Funnies - Beany Boy / Uncle Captain Horatio K. Huffenpuff
 1962 - Beany and Cecil - Beany Boy / Crowy / Uncle Captain Horatio K. Huffenpuff
 1963 - The New Casper Cartoon Show - Various  Voices
 1966-1967 - The Laurel and Hardy Cartoon Show - Oliver Hardy
 1969-1970 - Scooby Doo, Where Are You? - Additional Voices
 1971-1972 - The Funky Phantom - Additional Voices
 1972 - The New Scooby Doo Movies - Oliver Hardy / Additional Voices
 1972 - Wait Till Your Father Gets Home - Headlight Specialist / Service Manager - (As James MacGeorge)
 1973 - Speed Buggy - Additional Voices
 1973 - Yogi's Gang - Additional Voices
 1976 - Clue Club - Wimper
 1977-1978 - The Skatebirds - Wimper
 1977-1978 - The Three Robonic Stooges - Wimper
 1977-1980 - Captain Caveman and the Teen Angels - Additional Voices
 1978 - The Buford Files - Additional Voices
 1978 - Buford and the Galloping Ghost - Additional Voices
 1978 - Yogi's Space Race - Additional Voices
 1978-79 - Galaxy Goof-Ups - Additional Voices
 1979 - The New Fred and Barney Show - Additional Voices - (As Jim McGeorge)
 1979 - Casper and the Angels -  Additional Voices
 1979-1980 - The New Shmoo - Additional Voices
 1980-1981 - The Flintstone Primetime Specials - Stubby Frankenstone / Additional Voices
 1980 - The Flintstones' New Neighbors - TV special - Stubby Frankenstone / Additional Voices 
 1981 - The Flintstones: Wind-Up Wilma - TV special - Stubby Frankenstone / Cop / Additional Voices  - (As Jim McGeorge)
 1981 - The Kwicky Koala Show - Crazy Claws
 1981 - The Richie Rich/Scooby-Doo Show - Additional Voices
 1982 - Richie Rich - Additional Voices
 1984 - The Mighty Orbots - Bort
 1985 - The Jetsons - Additional Voices - (Second Series)
 1987 - Foofur -  Additional Voices
 1987 - Bionic Six - Dr. Wilmer Scarab / Mrs. Scarab
 1987 - DuckTales - Genghis Khan - (As Jim McGeorge)
 1988 - The New Adventures of Beany and Cecil - Uncle Captain Horatio K. Huffenpuff
 1989 - The Smurfs - Additional Voices
 1991 - TaleSpin - Dissident / Mick 
 2007 - Random! Cartoons - Giovanni

Film Roles
 1959 - Teenagers from Outer Space - Mac - Cop
 1968 - The World of Hans Christian Andersen - Kasper Kat / Governor / Han’s Father - (English Dub) - (Released March 1, 1971 United States)
 1977 - Star Wars - Several Characters

Live-Action Roles
 Unknown - Sesame Street - Several Characters - (Animated Segments)
 1958 - You Bet Your Life - Himself - Comic Book Storyline Writer - (As James MacGeorge) 
 1970 - Get Smart - Stan Laurel
 1970 - Happy Days - King Kong's Trainer
 1980 - Semi-Tough - Purlie
 1985 - Dom DeLuise and Friends - Himself
 2011 - Laurel and Hardy: Their Lives and Magic - TV Movie documentary - Himself - (Final Role)

Writer 
 1967 - George of the Jungle - 17 Episodes - 5 Scripts  
 1967 - Super Chicken - 16 Episodes
 1967 - Tom Slick - 17 Episodes
 1987 - Bionic Six - Story 1 Episode

References

External links
 

1928 births
2021 deaths
American male film actors
American male television actors
American male television writers
Place of death missing
Place of birth missing
American male voice actors
American television writers